Michael Stewart may refer to:

Entertainment
 Michael Stewart (playwright) (1924–1987), American playwright and librettist
 Michael Stewart (musician) (1945–2002), American producer and member of We Five
 Michael Stewart (writer) (born 1945), British writer of the novel Monkey Shines
 Mike Stewart (novelist) (born 1955), American novelist
 Michael Stewart (graffiti artist) (1958–1983), American graffiti artist, victim of police brutality in New York City in 1980s
 Michael Stewart (pyropainter) (born 1979), American surrealist artist
 Michael Stewart (music executive) (died 1999), American music executive
 Michael Stewart (1943–2007), American musician and record collector who performed as Backwards Sam Firk

Sports
 Mike Stewart (basketball) (born 1950), American basketball player
 Mike Stewart (bodyboarder) (born 1963), American bodyboarder and surfer
 Michael Stewart (American football) (born 1965), American football safety
 Michael Stewart (ice hockey) (born 1972), Canadian-Austrian ice hockey coach and former player
 Michael Stewart (basketball) (born 1975), French basketball player in the NBA
 Michael Stewart (boxer) (born 1977), American boxer
 Michael Stewart (footballer) (born 1981), Scottish association football player

Other
 Michael Stewart, Baron Stewart of Fulham (1906–1990), British Cabinet Minister
 Michael Margaret Stewart (1952–2015), American lawyer
 Mike Stewart (politician) (born 1965), member of the Tennessee House of Representatives

See also
 Stewart (disambiguation)
 Michael Stuart (disambiguation)